The Fragata Presidente Sarmiento is a multi-use stadium in Isidro Casanova, Argentina. It is currently used mostly for football matches and is the home ground of Almirante Brown. The stadium has a capacity of 25,000 spectators and it opened in 1969.

References

Fragata Presidente Sarmiento